N. K. Sukumaran Nair (6 June 1942 – 27 February 2021) was an acclaimed environmental activist and General Secretary of Pampa Samrakshana Samithi (PSS). He was born at Poovathur in Pathanamthitta District, Kerala State. He was the recipient of  Jaiji Peter Foundation Gold medal and citation for the State's best environmental activist in the year 2007. He has recently been engaged in working to save the Pamba River.
He was given the Paristhithi Mithra award in February 2018.

References

External links
www.hindu.com
www.hindu.com
www.thehindubusinessline.com
www.savepampa.org
www.thehindu.com
www.indiyanews.com

1942 births
2021 deaths
Indian non-fiction environmental writers
People from Pathanamthitta
Writers from Kerala
Activists from Kerala
Indian environmentalists